Board of Control may refer to:
 Board of Control (municipal government), an executive body that usually deals with financial and administrative matters
 Board of Control for Cricket in India
 Board of Control for Cricket in Sri Lanka, now Sri Lanka Cricket
 Board of Control for Lunacy and Mental Deficiency, a body overseeing the treatment of the mentally ill in England and Wales from 1913 to 1946
 British Boxing Board of Control
 California Board of Control, the former state financial oversight agency for California
 Florida Board of Control, a former statewide governing body for the State University System of Florida
 India Board, also known as the Board of Control, that oversaw the activities of the British East India Company
 Ottawa Board of Control, the city of Ottawa's elected executive body from 1908 until 1980
 Toronto Board of Control, the city of Toronto's elected executive body from 1904 until 1969